Otto Fernando Pérez Molina (born 1 December 1950) is a Guatemalan politician and retired general, who was President of Guatemala from 2012 to 2015. Standing as the Patriotic Party (Partido Patriota) candidate, he lost the 2007 presidential election but prevailed in the 2011 presidential election. During the 1990s, before entering politics, he served as Director of Military Intelligence,  Presidential Chief of Staff under President Ramiro de León Carpio, and as chief representative of the military for the Guatemalan Peace Accords. On being elected President, he called for the legalization of drugs.

On 2 September 2015, beset by corruption allegations and having been stripped of his immunity by Congress the day earlier, Pérez presented his resignation. He was arrested on 3 September 2015. Perez has remained in custody since his 2015 arrest.

Military career
Pérez is a graduate of Guatemala's National Military Academy (Escuela Politécnica), the School of the Americas and of the Inter-American Defense College.

He has served as Guatemala's Director of Military Intelligence and as inspector-general of the army. In 1983 he was a member of the group of army officers who backed Defence Minister Óscar Mejía's coup d'état against de facto president Efraín Ríos Montt.

While serving as chief of military intelligence in 1993, he was instrumental in forcing the departure of President Jorge Serrano. The president had attempted a "self-coup" by dissolving Congress and appointing new members to the Supreme Court (Corte Suprema de Justicia). (See 1993 Guatemalan constitutional crisis.)

In the wake of that event, Guatemala's human rights ombudsman, Ramiro de León Carpio, succeeded as president, according to the constitution. He appointed Pérez as his presidential chief of staff, a position he held until 1995. Considered a leader of the Guatemalan Army faction that favored a negotiated resolution of the 30-year-long Guatemalan Civil War, Pérez represented the military in the negotiations with guerrilla forces. They achieved the 1996 Peace Accords.

Between 1998 and 2000, Pérez represented Guatemala on the Inter-American Defense Board.

Political career
In February 2001, he founded the Patriotic Party. In the 2003 general election on 9 November 2003, Pérez was elected to Congress.

He was the candidate of the Patriotic Party in the 2007 presidential election, campaigning under the slogan "Mano dura, cabeza y corazón" ("Firm hand, head and heart"), advocating a hard-line approach to rising crime in the country. After receiving the second-largest number of votes in the initial contest on 9 September, he lost the election to Álvaro Colom of the National Unity of Hope in the second round on 4 November 2007.

During the 2007 presidential campaign, several members of the Patriotic Party were killed by armed assailants. Victims included Aura Marina Salazar Cutzal, an indigenous woman who was secretary to the party's congressional delegation and an assistant to Pérez.

Presidency
Pérez was finally elected in the November 2011 presidential election with 54% of the vote, and took office on 14 January 2012. Pérez was the first former military official to be elected to the presidency since Guatemala's return to democratic elections in 1986.

He proposed the legalisation of drugs when he first became president while attending the United Nations General Assembly, as he said that the War on Drugs has proven to be a failure.

Corruption charges, arrest and trial

In April 2015, international prosecutors, with help from the UN, presented evidence of a customs corruption ring ("La Línea") in which discounted tariffs were exchanged for bribes from importers; prosecutors learned of the ring through wiretaps and financial statements. Vice President Roxana Baldetti resigned on 8 May, and was arrested for her involvement on 21 August. On 21 August, Guatemalan prosecutors presented evidence of Pérez's involvement in the corruption ring. Congress, in a 132–0 vote, stripped Pérez Molina of prosecutorial immunity on 1 September 2015, and, on 2 September, he presented his resignation from the Presidency.

On 3 September, after a court hearing in which charges and evidence against him were presented, he was arrested and sent to the Matamoros prison in Guatemala City.  Vice President Alejandro Maldonado Aguirre was appointed to serve the remainder of Pérez's 4-year term in office (due to end on 14 January 2016).

On 27 October 2017,  Judge Miguel Ángel Gálvez of Guatemala City ordered Pérez, Baldetti, and another 26 people, including former senior officials from Guatemala's customs duty system, to stand trial on charges related to bribes channeled to officials helping businesses evade customs duties and Pérez has remained in custody since his 2015 arrest. In May 2021, one of the five corruption and money laundering charges against Pérez was dropped, though it was also agreed that Pérez would still be detained in a military base prison.

On 18 January 2022, Pérez's corruption trial officially began. Baldetti, who was previously convicted in another "La Linea" related trial, was named as his co-defendant.

Accusations of human rights abuses

Civil war atrocities
In 2011 reports were made, based on United States' National Security Archives, that Pérez was involved in the scorched earth campaigns of the 1980s under the military dictator Efraín Ríos Montt. Pérez commanded a counterinsurgency team in the Ixil Community in 1982-3 and is accused of ordering the mass murder of civilians, destruction of villages and resettlement of the remaining population in army-controlled areas. Investigative journalist Allan Nairn interviewed Pérez Molina in Ixil in 1982, and reported that Pérez Molina had been involved in the torture and murder of four suspected guerrillas.

In July 2011, the indigenous organization Waqib Kej presented a letter to the United Nations accusing Pérez of involvement in genocide and torture committed in Quiché during the civil war. Among other evidence, they cited a 1982 documentary in which a military officer whom they claim is Pérez is seen near four dead bodies. In the following scene, a subordinate says that those four were captured alive and taken "to the Major" (allegedly Pérez) and that "they wouldn't talk, not when we asked nicely and not when we were mean [ni por las buenas ni por las malas]."

Although it is clear that Pérez Molina actively participated in a particularly dirty counterinsurgency campaign, he has denied any involvement in atrocities. Declassified US documents present him as one of the more progressive Guatemalan military officers, who had a hand in the downfall of General Ríos Montt.

Allegations of involvement in the killing of Efraín Bámaca
In 1992, the guerrilla leader Efraín Bámaca Velásquez disappeared. His wife, American lawyer Jennifer Harbury, has presented evidence that Pérez, who was Director of Military Intelligence at the time, probably issued the orders to detain and torture the commandante.

In 2011, he became the subject of a new investigation into the disappearance of Bámaca.

Allegations of involvement in the murder of Catholic bishop Gerardi
In his book The Art of Political Murder: Who Killed the Bishop?, American journalist Francisco Goldman argues that Pérez Molina may have been present, along with two other high officials, a few blocks from the April 1998 murder of Juan José Gerardi Conedera, a Roman Catholic bishop. Prosecutors in the subsequent trial said that Pérez and the other two men were there to supervise the assassination. Gerardi was murdered two days after the release of a human rights report he helped prepare for the United Nations' Historical Clarification Commission.

Personal life
Pérez is married to Rosa María Leal.

On 21 February 2000, shortly before Pérez planned to launch his new political party, his daughter Lissette was attacked by a gunman. The same day, a woman named Patricia Castellanos Fuentes de Aguilar was shot and killed after meeting with Pérez's wife, Rosa María Leal. On 11 November 2000, Pérez's son, Otto Pérez Leal, was attacked while driving; Pérez Leal's wife and infant daughter were also in the vehicle. Human rights groups said that the attacks were politically motivated.

References

External links

Otto Pérez Molina: Patriotic Party profile
Biography by CIDOB 
US Government Glosses Over War Crime Accusations Against Leading Guatemalan Presidential Candidate
Notorious Graduates (of the School of the Americas) from Guatemala
Guatemalan Election Marred by Violence
Guatemala: Six Months to Examine the Past and Define the Future
Guatemala (1983 documentary): Parts 1, 2, 3, 4, 5

Presidents of Guatemala
Guatemalan military personnel
1950 births
Living people
People of the Guatemalan Civil War
Members of the Congress of Guatemala
Patriotic Party (Guatemala) politicians
Guatemalan anti-communists
People from Guatemala City
20th-century Guatemalan people
21st-century Guatemalan people
Guatemalan politicians convicted of crimes
Heads of government who were later imprisoned